Goshen, sometimes called Hutcheson, is an Unincorporated community in Walker County, Texas, United States.

References

Kingston, Mike (ed.). "Town Names: Past and Present", Texas Almanac. Dallas: Dallas Morning News, 2000, cited in GNIS

See also
Goshen

Unincorporated communities in Walker County, Texas
Unincorporated communities in Texas
Former populated places in Texas
Ghost towns in East Texas